The Guangzhou Derbies, or Canton Derbies  are various local derbies between the football teams of Guangzhou. The term specifically refers to individual matches between the teams, but can also be used to describe the general rivalry between the different clubs. Guangzhou Apollo (predecessor of Guangzhou) against Guangzhou Matsunichi (1995–2000) and Guangzhou against Guangzhou City are ranked as two of the most ferocious Guangzhou Derbies.

Clubs
As of 2023 season, there are two clubs in the Chinese Super League, China League One and China League Two that play in Guangzhou:
 Guangzhou City (Super League)
 Guangzhou (League One)
Former clubs in the highest league include Guangdong Hongyuan F.C. (Jia-A 1994-1997) and Guangzhou Matsunichi F.C. (Jia-A 1996 & 1998-1999). Guangzhou Baiyunshan F.C., Guangdong Xiongying F.C. and Guangdong Sunray Cave F.C. were formerly in the second-tier league.

Guangzhou Apollo v Guangzhou Matsunichi

History
When professionalism was established within the Chinese football leagues in 1994, it opened the door for more than one team within each region. This saw the establishment of Guangzhou Matsunichi which used to be the youth academy of Guangzhou FC but were sold off to Matsunichi Digital Holdings Limited. Direct ties between these two teams also saw them share the Yuexiushan Stadium. In their first meeting in the first round of the 1995 Chinese FA Cup, Matsunichi beat Guangzhou FC 4–3 on aggregate. For a brief period during the 1998 season, both teams were in the top tier with Matsunichi finishing higher than Guangzhou FC. On 9 August 1998 in the second Guangzhou Derby that season, a Chinese first-tier league record of five red cards and nine yellow cards was issued. Apollo's Peter Blazincic, Wen Junwu and Mai Guangliang as well as Matsunichi's Leonardo Jara and Tu Shengqiao were sent off during the match. The rivalry reached its peak and subsequent conclusion during the 2000 season with both clubs in the second tier fighting relegation. On 15 July 2000, Guangzhou FC won 3–1 against Matsunichi which inevitability helped lead to Matsunichi's relegation, causing Matsunichi to disband at the end of the season.

Official match results

Statistics

Guangzhou v Guangzhou City

History
When Guangzhou R&F (predecessor of Guangzhou City) moved to the city of Guangzhou, a local derby, often referred to as the Canton derby, was born. The first Canton derby was at Yuexiushan Stadium on 16 March 2012 as Guangzhou Evergrande (predecessor of Guangzhou) lost 2–0 against Guangzhou R&F. Relations between the two club owners remain cordial off the pitch and club owners Xu Jiayin and Zhang Li were seen enjoying a meal together instead of watching the second derby in 2012 which Guangzhou R&F also won.

Official match results

Statistics
Statistics as of 10 Dec 2022.

Top goalscorers
Below is the list of players who have scored at least two goals in official meetings.

References

China football rivalries
 
Guangzhou F.C.
Guangzhou City F.C.
Football in Guangzhou